Michael Bresciani (born 20 December 1994 in Desenzano del Garda) is an Italian former professional cyclist, who rode professionally in 2015 and from 2017 to 2020, for the ,  and  teams.

In October 2017 it was revealed that Bresciani had tested positive for furosemide, a diuretic which can be used as a masking agent, at the Italian National Road Race Championships in June of that year: he claimed that this was due to his food being accidentally contaminated by his mother, who takes furosemide as a medication. He served a backdated two-month suspension.

Major results
2015
 5th Paris–Chauny
2016
 9th Trofeo Città di San Vendemiano
2017
 3rd Circuito del Porto

References

External links

1994 births
Living people
Italian male cyclists
Cyclists from the Province of Brescia